Theodore Gibson is an American former Negro league third baseman who played in the 1940s.

Gibson played for the Chicago American Giants in 1941. In seven recorded games, he posted four hits in 16 plate appearances.

References

External links
 and Seamheads

Year of birth missing
Place of birth missing
Chicago American Giants players